Allan Bohlin (5 November 1907 – 23 January 1959) was a Swedish film actor. He appeared in more than 40 films between 1934 and 1956.

Selected filmography

 The Song to Her (1934)
 The Atlantic Adventure (1934)
 Walpurgis Night (1935)
 Under False Flag (1935)
 65, 66 and I (1936)
 Johan Ulfstjerna (1936)
 Klart till drabbning (1937)
 The Andersson Family (1937)
 Oh, Such a Night! (1937)
 Landstormens lilla Lotta (1939)
 Whalers (1939)
 Variety Is the Spice of Life (1939)
 Oh, What a Boy! (1939)
 With Open Arms (1940)
 The Crazy Family (1940)
 Poor Ferdinand (1941)
 Lärarinna på vift (1941)
 The Train Leaves at Nine (1941)
 Lilla helgonet (1944)
 Oss tjuvar emellan eller En burk ananas (1945)
 Motherhood (1945)
 Crisis (1946)
 The Night Watchman's Wife (1947)
 Flottans kavaljerer (1948)
 The Red Horses (1954)

References

External links

1907 births
1959 deaths
Swedish male film actors
Male actors from Stockholm
20th-century Swedish male actors